Brennan may refer to:

People
 Brennan (surname)
 Brennan (given name)
 Bishop Brennan (disambiguation)

Places
 Brennan, Idlib, a village located in Sinjar Nahiyah in Maarrat al-Nu'man District, Idlib, Syria
 Rabeeah Brennan, a village located in Sinjar Nahiyah in Maarrat al-Nu'man District, Idlib, Syria
 Electoral division of Brennan, an electoral division of Australia's Northern Territory

Other uses
 Brennan Award (disambiguation), various awards
 Brennan Motor Manufacturing Company of Syracuse, New York, a manufacturer of automobile engines from 1897 to 1972
 Brennan torpedo, a torpedo patented in 1877
 Brennan's, a creole restaurant in New Orleans, Louisiana
 Brennan Family Restaurants, a group of restaurants operated by the Brennan family of New Orleans

de:Brennan
ru:Бреннан